Grêmio Recreativo Escola de Samba Unidos do Viradouro, or simply Viradouro or Unidos do Viradouro, is a samba school that competes in the Carnival city of Rio de Janeiro.
It is located in the Barreto neighborhood in Niterói.

History 

It was founded on 24 June 1946 by Nelson dos Santos, known as Jangada, who organized drumming in the backyard of his home in Capitão Roseira, at the top of D. Mário Viana street, known as Viradouro street. He also competed in the Niterói parades for 39 years (1947 to 1985); however, during the period he came to Rio de Janeiro a few times (64 and 65), getting more than a 26th in the third division.

After being champion eighteen times, Viradouro decided to try their luck again in 1986. They gave good shows in the lower groups, where they won Group 3 in 1989 with the theme "merchants and peddlers" and Group 1 the following year with "Just the written", coming to the special group in 1991.

In 1992, they presented the plot A magia da sorte chego by Max Lopes, and told the story of the gypsies. However, the school could not count on such luck in their parade, where one of the floats caught fire and burned uncontrollably. Many wards had to squeeze together to make way for a fire department vehicle. This delay resulted in the loss of 13 points in timing, and these lost points left the school in 9th place.

With the ida of Joãosinho Trinta, which uncurled from Beija-Flor, the school began to hold first place, with exception of 1996, when they were almost demoted. However, with Dominguinhos do Estácio as singer and the storyline Trevas, Viradouro brought to the avenue beautiful play colors, contrasting black and white, dark and light. One of the highlights of this parade was that the drums played "paradinha" with some bars in a funk rhythm, under the direction of Maestro Jorjão.

In August 2005, the school lost its president, bicheiro José Carlos Monassa Bessil, who died from a hemorrhage resulting from a stomach ulcer. Marco Lira was elected as his successor, who put all of his chips on the modern Paulo Barros to bring the plot "The Viradouro turns the game", trying to return to the title they had not won in 10 years. One aspect of this parade was the drums. The drums were on top of a float, a large chess board conducted by Maestro Ciça, placing Juliana Paes in front as queen of the drums, who descended from the car in the middle of the avenue.

In 2008, the school continued with the talent of Paulo Barros and the plot "É de Arrepiar!" who spoke of various sensations perceived by the human being, that would make you shudder, such as cold, sexual pleasure, emotion in general, fear, disgust and repugnance to evil. For both, the club changed its interpreter and one of the floats, which would represent the victims of the Holocaust, was banned by the justice after an action brought by Jewish groups, who considered the car offensive. Outraged, the carnavalesco argued that history could not be censored, and samba would be no less worthy to tell a real story than were films such as Schindler's List. With the ban, all the sculptures were destroyed, and the float passed, covered, through the parade.

With the departure of Paulo Barros the school was lost. It suffered a demotion in the year 2010 with a tribute to Mexico, a parade of dubious level done by Júnior Schall and Edson Pereira. However in this parade had a controversy with the choice of the queen of battery: Julia Lira, only 7 years old, the daughter of Marco Lira. There was criticism of this choice, since the position of queen of battery is usually occupied by women seen as sex symbols.

After 3 years in  the school returned to the special with a tribute to their city. However, the return among the elite of the samba did not go well and was badly hampered by rain. In preparation for the A Series dispute in 2016, Viradouro bet on a strong team to try to return to the Special Group. For the drums they brought Paulinho Botelho, in the composition of the couple of Maestro Sala and Porte Bandeira, the experienced Marquinhos and Giovanna and a pair to choreograph the front committee, Sylvio Lemgruber and Fernanda Misailidis, with Wilsinho, as director of carnival. With a beautiful parade, the club won 3rd place.

In 2018, the Viradouro school scored yet another victory in the A Series championship and thus secured once more its place in the Special Group in the 2019 parade, ending its campaign with a runner-up finish. One year later, Viradouro won the championship.

Classifications

References 

Samba schools of Rio de Janeiro
Jogo do Bicho
1946 establishments in Brazil
Niterói